Turaqayeh (also Romanized as Tūrāqayeh; also known as Ţūrāghāy) is a village in Mehranrud-e Markazi Rural District, in the Central District of Bostanabad County, East Azerbaijan Province, Iran. At the 2006 census, its population was 896, in 159 families.

References 

Populated places in Bostanabad County